Unione Sportiva Russi is an Italian association football club located in Russi, Emilia-Romagna.

In the season 2010–11, from Serie D group D relegated to Eccellenza Emilia-Romagna.

Colors and badge
Its colors are orange and black.

External links
Official Site

Football clubs in Italy
Football clubs in Emilia-Romagna
Association football clubs established in 1925
Serie C clubs
1925 establishments in Italy
Russi